Bremnes Idrettslag is a Norwegian sports club from Bremnes in the county of Hordaland, Norway. It has sections for association football, team handball, basketball, track and field and gymnastics.

The club was founded in 1945.

The men's football team plays in the Fourth Division, the fifth tier of Norwegian football. It played in the Third Division from 1993 to 1994, 1996 to 2005 and in the year 2007. Notable players including Arne Larsen Økland,  Geirmund Brendesæter, Martin Hollund and Joakim Våge Nilsen started their careers here.

References

Official site 

Football clubs in Norway
Association football clubs established in 1945
Sport in Hordaland
Athletics clubs in Norway
1945 establishments in Norway